is a former Japanese football player.

Club statistics

References

External links

1984 births
Living people
Association football people from Hokkaido
Japanese footballers
J1 League players
J2 League players
Cerezo Osaka players
Hokkaido Consadole Sapporo players
ReinMeer Aomori players
Association football defenders